This list of Resident Evil characters describes original characters that are introduced in the Resident Evil series of live-action horror films directed by Paul W. S. Anderson. The characters are described, below, using in-universe tone.

Alice Abernathy

Alice Abernathy-Marcus (portrayed by Milla Jovovich) is the main protagonist of the Resident Evil film series. The plot of each film generally revolves around her struggle with the Umbrella Corporation. Alice also appears in the film's novelizations which go into greater detail of her backstory, including her surname "Abernathy" (which is unspoken in the films).

Alice is an original character created for the films, although Anderson noted that Alice was meant as an amalgamation to all the female protagonists in the Resident Evil games, namely Jill Valentine, Claire Redfield, and Ada Wong. Anderson initially toyed with the idea of the film being an allegory to Alice's Adventures in Wonderland by Lewis Carroll, but the idea was not followed through completely. Despite this, the film contains various references to the work, including Alice's name and the Red Queen A.I. as a recurring villain. Although the name Alice was given as the character's name prior to Resident Evils release and is listed in the credits, her name is not actually spoken until the second film, Resident Evil: Apocalypse.

In the first film, Resident Evil, Alice is depicted as suffering from amnesia, gradually realizing her abilities as a highly trained private security operative. In Resident Evil: Apocalypse and Resident Evil: Extinction, her character is represented as "a supremely efficient killing machine" and bio-weapon. Alice is an "iconic figure and is closely associated with the series," becoming more skilled and rugged throughout the series. Alice's superhuman abilities, as well as the use of various styles of martial arts and gunplay make her something of a superhero character. For example, in Resident Evil: Apocalypse, after her exposure to the T-virus, she displays psychic powers akin to those of Alexia Ashford. In Extinction, her powers are even more developed - she displays even greater control over her telekinesis (though she experiences blackouts and massive headaches if she pushes her powers too far). In Resident Evil: Afterlife, Alice's superhuman abilities have been taken away by Albert Wesker, who injected her with a serum that disabled her T-virus cells; however, at the end of Resident Evil: Retribution, Wesker injects her with the T-virus and restores her powers, saying that Alice and her powers are the last, best hope for humanity. In Resident Evil: The Final Chapter, after being betrayed by Wesker, Alice undertakes a final mission into the Hive with the help of Claire Redfield and the Red Queen to save what is left of humanity. In this movie, she displays none of her powers despite Wesker restoring them at the end of Retribution, with the Red Queen commenting about Wesker having only pretended to restore her powers. Also revealed in The Final Chapter by the true Alexander Issacs that, in light of the numerous clones of her throughout Extinction, Afterlife, and Retribution, Alice herself is a clone as well, the "original" duplicate/twin sister of Alicia Marcus (also played by Jovovich), the terminally ill daughter of Umbrella founder Dr. James Marcus, who created the original strain of T-Virus as a potential cure to all genetic disorders and diseases. Alicia herself was the reason Marcus developed the virus, as she suffered from progeria, leaving Marcus to place her into cryogenic suspension until he could complete it, only to be betrayed and murdered by Issacs and Wesker, who sought to use the imperfect virus and further strains to enact a zombie apocalypse to make Umbrella the sole world power.

Rain OcampoRain Ocampo (played by Michelle Rodriguez) is introduced in the first Resident Evil film, in which she works for the Umbrella Corporation's commando force. During the outbreak in The Hive, Rain and the other operatives are sent down to shut the Red Queen down and contain the infection. During The Hive incident, Rain and Alice become very close. Rain is bitten by one of the infected and is on the point of death when Alice administers the anti-virus to her. However it is too late to reverse the effects so that Rain dies and has to be killed by Matt when she revives as a zombie. Several clones of Rain Ocampo are introduced in Resident Evil: Retribution, including a "Good Rain", created as a test subject for the Umbrella Corporation's live tests on the human response to viral outbreaks, a "Bad Rain", who works for an Umbrella-brainwashed Jill Valentine, and a "Zombie Rain". Good Rain, along with a little girl named Becky who is the daughter of an Alice clone, survives a test scenario of the T-virus in a suburban situation. Good Rain is killed when a Licker throws her into a pillar, breaking her neck. Bad Rain helps fight against Alice and her allies and injects herself with the Las Plagas parasite, making her super-strong and invincible. Bad Rain kills Luther West and nearly kills Alice before Alice shoots out the ice under her feet, dropping her into an ocean full of Las Plagas zombies who devour her. During a deleted scene, Zombie Rain is seen during the New York simulation. She charged Ada and Alice from the left, emerging from an alley and attempted to blindside Alice. Alice reacts quickly enough that she kills the clone with a shot to the head.

Matt Addison/The NemesisMatt Addison (played by Eric Mabius) and The Nemesis T-Type (played by Matthew G. Taylor) appear in Resident Evil and Resident Evil: Apocalypse. Matt first appears as an anti-Umbrella activist posing as a newly transferred Raccoon City police officer, who has sent his sister to work at Umbrella Corporation to steal some information to expose Umbrella for illegal activity. When the T-virus is released at the Umbrella "Hive", the Red Queen seals the Hive, killing everyone inside including Matt's sister. Matt is arrested by a group of Umbrella operatives, led by One.

Along with Alice, he is then taken to the Hive where they are met by a horde of zombies. Matt and Alice are separated and Matt comes across his zombified sister. Alice saves Matt's life, but he later becomes infected when they are attacked by a Licker. Matt begins to mutate, and Alice is preparing to give him the anti-virus when the mansion door bursts open and a group of Umbrella scientists take him. He is then put into the "Nemesis Program". In Resident Evil: Apocalypse, Matt has been transformed into the mutation "Nemesis T-Type", programmed to eradicate all remaining S.T.A.R.S. operatives. He tracks Alice down and they are forced to fight to the death. Alice realizes Nemesis is Matt and refuses to kill him. Nemesis joins forces with Alice and they defend themselves from a helicopter, sent by the Umbrella forces to kill them. However, in the ensuing battle, Nemesis (Matt) is crushed  by wreckage and presumed dead. If he survived, he was killed when a nuclear weapon destroyed the city.

K-MartK-Mart (played by Spencer Locke) is a young woman in Claire Redfield's convoy. In Resident Evil: Extinction, K-Mart explains that she changed her name after Claire and the others had found her in a Kmart store. She states she did not like her name and decided to change it because all those she knew from before the outbreak were dead. In the film's original script, K-Mart's real name is Elizabeth Jane Case. In the novelisation of the film, Carlos reveals that her original name was Dahlia. K-Mart and Claire are close and Locke has said her character sees Claire as an older sister. K-Mart is close with Mikey, and even more so with Carlos; in the novelisation of the film and in a scene that was deleted from the film, it is stated she has a crush on him. K-Mart also bonds with Alice; she stays with Alice and gives her a bracelet when Alice passes out from using her powers to save the convoy. Locke has said that K-Mart "definitely look[s] up to Alice in this movie a lot." K-Mart survives through most of the film by hiding in the vehicles, although she does kill a few zombies. In a zombie attack, she is nearly killed by L.J. who has turned into a zombie himself, but Carlos saves her. At the end, she is one of the few who have survived long enough to depart in a helicopter headed for Alaska, piloted by Claire. In Resident Evil: Afterlife, K-Mart has been captured by the Umbrella Corporation to be experimented upon. She is rescued by Alice, Claire and Chris Redfield, but is at first too addled to do anything. She later aids Alice in battle, knocking out Bennett and tossing Alice her shotgun, allowing Alice to (temporarily) defeat Wesker with a shot to the head. She is later seen standing on deck with the other survivors when Umbrella commandos attack the ship; her whereabouts are unknown.

BeckyBecky''' (played by Aryana Engineer) is a clone of a young deaf girl, residing in the "Suburban Raccoon City" environment of the Umbrella Prime facility. In Resident Evil: Retribution, she is first introduced as the deaf "daughter" of a clone of Alice and her "husband" Todd, a clone of Carlos Olivera. During a "bio hazard" test, Becky lost her father, while her mother hid her; unknown to Becky, the Alice clone was killed by the zombified Todd. When the real Alice arrives with Ada Wong, Becky mistakes Alice for her mother; Alice decides to take Becky along despite Ada's objections. Mostly unknowing of the truth about her existence, Becky followed Alice and her comrades. When an Uber-Licker kidnapped her, Becky was rescued by Alice; however, they unfortunately had to escape through the clone storage room. Partly realising the truth, Becky asked Alice if she was her mother; Alice responded that she was now. They were rescued and taken with Ada, Leon, and Jill to Washington DC, where the last of humanity had established their base in the White House. When Wesker ultimately betrays the survivors it is presumed that she is killed along with the others after he destroys the White House, leaving only Alice alive.

 Red Queen 
The Red Queen (played by Michaela Dicker, Megan Charpentier, Ave Merson-O'Brian and Ever Anderson) is a  character of the Resident Evil film series. The Red Queen was created by the director Paul W. S. Anderson as a homage to 2001: A Space Odysseys HAL 9000. She appears as the main antagonist in the first and the fifth film, and returns in the sixth film as a supporting character.

In Resident Evil, the Red Queen's holographic avatar was modeled on the daughter of Umbrella's head programmer. She monitors the Hive and the Spencer Mansion above. When the T-virus was released, she sealed the exits and killed the Umbrella employees; she also released a gas that left Alice out cold with amnesia. When an Umbrella U.B.C.S. commando team is sent to investigate, she kills most of them with her defense systems. She warns against entering the Hive, but they shut her down. She is later forced to help the survivors find a way out, since her main circuit breakers were disabled to prevent rebooting. As the anti-virus has a slimmer chance of working the longer one is infected, she demands Rain be killed; however, she is shut down by Kaplan.

In an early draft of Resident Evil: Apocalypse, Angie, the daughter of T-virus' creator Dr. Charles Ashford, was to be revealed as the girl on whose appearance the Red Queen was based, and her father as the person that built the supercomputer that houses her. When the filmmakers realized they would need a large amount of flashback footage from the previous film to explain the connection to those in the audience that had not seen it, they decided to drop the idea, removing it from the canon. Nevertheless, some people have made the connection due to Angie's appearance and accent strongly evoking the Red Queen. The novelization of Resident Evil: Extinction also explicitly states the connection.

In Resident Evil: Extinction, Alice encounters the White Queen, a sister artificial intelligence to the Red Queen, who similarly looks like a young girl, but dressed in white. The White Queen justifies her sister's actions, as the most logical path to contain the viral outbreak inside The Hive. Nevertheless, she had decided to assist Alice by attempting to synthesis a cure to the outbreak after revealing her DNA to be potentially able to counteract the T-virus. 

The Red Queen makes a reappearance in Resident Evil: Retribution, portrayed by child actress Megan Charpentier with another actress, Ave Merson-O'Brian, providing her voice. After the Raccoon City incident, she was reactivated and placed in control over Umbrella Prime, an underground laboratory in Kamchatka. By the time Retribution begins, she has assumed control over Umbrella itself and is waging war against the human race, including Wesker, using various bioweapons.

The Red Queen reappears in Resident Evil: The Final Chapter, this time portrayed by Ever Gabo Anderson, the real daughter of Milla Jovovich (Alice) and Paul W. S. Anderson, the film's writer/director. In The Final Chapter, the Red Queen contacts Alice to warn her that the last human settlement will be destroyed in 48 hours. The Red Queen directs Alice back into the Hive to find a potent anti-virus that will kill everything infected with the T-virus upon contact. The Red Queen is revealed to have been created based upon Alicia Marcus, the daughter of Umbrella co-founder James Marcus (with Ever Gabo portraying young Alicia in flashback footage). The Red Queen is willing to aid Alice as she has been programmed to protect human life, but is also unable to directly harm Umbrella forces due to another directive in her programming. During the final battle in the Hive, the Red Queen is able to aid Alice by dropping a blast door on Wesker after the adult Alicia Marcus (played by Jovovich, as all Alices are clones of Alicia) fires him. The Red Queen is later shut down by Doctor Isaacs, but first she taunts "Doctor Alexander Isaacs and the Umbrella High Command. You are all going to die down here", echoing her words to Alice and the soldiers in the first movie. When Isaacs is killed, the Red Queen reactivates herself and recalls the Umbrella forces sent to destroy the last human settlement, saving humanity. After the Hive is destroyed and the anti-virus released, the Red Queen is revealed to have survived the Hive's destruction when she contacts Alice and explains how Alice survived the anti-virus. The Red Queen displays Alicia Marcus' childhood memories for Alice, memories that Alicia had uploaded into the AI so that Alice would have them as well.

Although the character originated in the films, the Red Queen also appears in the 2007 game Resident Evil: The Umbrella Chronicles, voiced by Tara Platt. Her character appears as a database computer which provides information relating to the Arklay Incident and T-virus development. In the game's chapter "The Umbrella's End", the T-A.L.O.S. (Tyrant-Armored Lethal Organic System) is monitored and controlled by the Red Queen. In the game, the Red Queen AI is self-aware and can take these measures based on its own judgment. At the end of the game, Wesker manages to procure all the data the Red Queen possessed for himself, and has it permanently erase itself and deactivate.

 Lloyd Jefferson “LJ” Wade Lloyd Jefferson "LJ" Wade (portrayed by Mike Epps) is a main character and protagonist appearing in Resident Evil: Apocalypse and Resident Evil: Extinction.

When the zombie outbreak begins in Raccoon City in Resident Evil: Apocalypse, LJ is handcuffed in the police station next to a zombified prostitute. He is saved when Jill Valentine arrives and kills all of the zombies in the police station and frees LJ, ordering him to flee the city. While driving through the city later, LJ becomes distracted by another zombified prostitute and crashes his car. He links up with S.T.A.R.S., but becomes the only survivor when Nemesis slaughters everyone in the building. At first, Nemesis focuses his fire on the officers and then ignores LJ as an unarmed threat after he disarms himself. LJ is contacted by Charles Ashford and joins the effort to rescue Angela Ashford. During the final battle at City Hall, LJ hijacks the Umbrella helicopter and knocks Major Timothy Cain unconscious when he tries to escape. LJ survives the helicopter crash and helps to rescue Alice from an Umbrella facility at the end of the movie.

In Resident Evil: Extinction, five years after the beginning of the zombie apocalypse, LJ is a member of Claire Redfield's convoy alongside Carlos and had developed a relationship with convoy nurse Betty. While investigating a deserted motel, LJ kills two zombies, but not before he gets bitten by one. LJ hides his infection from everyone else and helps Betty save the convoy's children when they come under attack by zombified crows. The convoy is saved by the sudden appearance of Alice, but Betty is killed, devastating LJ. As the convoy moves towards the ruins of Las Vegas for supplies, LJ's condition begins rapidly deteriorating, though he continues to hide the truth from his friends. During the Super Undead attack, LJ manages to kill two before running out of ammunition and being forced to hide in a truck with K-Mart. When a Super Undead attacks the truck, LJ's condition has deteriorated so much that K-Mart is forced to kill the zombie herself with a shotgun in the truck. Unnoticed by K-Mart, LJ dies shortly afterwards and reanimates. As he tries to attack K-Mart, LJ is pulled from the truck by Carlos whom he bites. Devastated by his zombified friend's state, Carlos kills the undead LJ with a shot to the head, but is left fatally infected by the T-virus, leading to his later sacrifice to clear a path for the convoy survivors.

 Major Timothy Cain Major Timothy Cain is the main antagonist of Resident Evil: Apocalypse. A high-ranking member of the Umbrella Corporation's military, the Umbrella Biohazard Countermeasures Services, or U.B.C.S., Cain is placed in charge of the quarantine of Raccoon City when word of the Hive being reopened and the infected within escaping reaches Umbrella, guarding the Raven's Gate Bridge that serves as the only means out of the city for the uninfected civilian population. When one man at the checkpoint drops dead of a heart attack and reanimates as a T-virus infected zombie, Cain is forced to seal the exit and send everyone back into the city to their doom with a show of force by having his men fire their weapons into the air to intimidate them. Cain later has Alice and Matt Addison, now the Nemesis, awoken to face each other in battle, and upon learning of Dr. Charles Ashford trying to help Alice and the other survivors escape Raccoon City before Umbrella destroys it with a tactical nuclear bomb to cover up their mistakes, captures Ashford and confronts the group on the roof of the Raccoon City Hall, forcing Alice into fighting the Nemesis by killing Ashford and threatening to do the same to his daughter Angela, L.J., Carlos, and Jill if Alice still refuses.

Though Alice is able to defeat Nemesis, she refuses to kill him upon realizing he's Matt. Cain tries to have Nemesis kill Alice instead, but Nemesis, having regained his memories, turns on Cain and takes out his Umbrella troops, before sacrificing himself to take out the Umbrella attack helicopters with his Stinger, being crushed by the resulting debris. Cain tries to escape on the transport helicopter that was to be Alice and the others' way out of the city, but Alice, infuriated by Cain's actions, throws him out of the helicopter after it starts to take off, causing him to break his leg when he lands back on the roof. Surrounded by the zombie horde, Cain tries to fight them off with a discarded pistol, but realizing his fate, turns the gun on himself to commit suicide, but finds that he's out of bullets. In an ironic twist, the first zombie to reach and bite him was the reanimated Dr. Ashford. Cain is vaporized with the zombie horde when the tactical nuke detonates over Raccoon City Hall and obliterates the city.

 Charles Ashford 
A high-ranking scientist with Umbrella, Dr. Charles Ashford (played by Jared Harris) is evacuated out of Raccoon City when word of the Hive being reopened and the infected within escaping forces Umbrella to pull all their employees in Raccoon City out of the area before establishing their quarantine perimeter. Although Ashford is safely evacuated, his daughter Angela, who was pulled out of her class at Raccoon City Elementary, doesn't make the rendezvous when her evacuation vehicle is struck by a tanker truck driven by a T-virus infected driver, killing the Umbrella security personnel sent to retrieve her, while she escapes and retreats back to her school, remaining there as the virus infects her teachers, classmates, and other residents of the city, including a set of R.P.D. K-9 police dogs when the school was properly evacuated by the R.P.D. after suggestion from former S.T.A.R.S. officer Jill Valentine.

Fearing for his daughter's safety, Ashford is able to hack into Raccoon City's CCTV system, and contacting Alice and other survivors, such as Jill, L.J., and members of the U.B.C.S., like Carlos, he offers them a way out of the city before Umbrella has it nuked to cover up their actions in return for the rescue and return of his daughter. Though Angela is safely recovered, Ashford's actions are discovered by Major Cain, and he is taken hostage as Cain confronts the escapees at the rendezvous point at Raccoon City Hall. When Alice refuses to fight Nemesis under Cain's orders, Ashford is mercilessly executed by Cain as a show of force to get her to fight Nemesis, with Cain threatening to kill Angela, Jill, Carlos, and L.J. next if she continues to resist.

After Cain is left to fend for himself by Alice while she and the other survivors escape before the city is nuked, Ashford gets his revenge for Cain killing him when the T-virus reanimates him as a zombie, and he is the first to reach Cain and begins to devour him before the rest of the horde join him. They are all vaporized when the nuke detonates over Raccoon City Hall.

 Alexander Isaacs Doctor Alexander Roland Isaacs (played by Iain Glen) is the main antagonist of the Resident Evil series, though this is not known until Resident Evil: The Final Chapter. One of the two founders of the Umbrella Corporation, Isaacs was the true mastermind behind the release of the T-virus as revealed in The Final Chapter, planning to wipe the world clean of humanity and repopulate it with the Umbrella elite kept in cryogenic stasis in the Hive beneath Raccoon City. Isaacs murdered his partner Doctor James Marcus and raised Marcus' daughter Alicia who inherited her father's half of the company, allowing him to control it and her. Anderson had stated he was originally intended to be the film version of Dr. William Birkin (who was supposed to be played by Jason Isaacs) who did show up briefly at the end of the first film, but due to Isaacs being unable to return, the character was retooled into Dr. Alexander Isaacs and recast to Iain Glen, albeit named after the previous actor.

In Resident Evil: Apocalypse, Isaacs, later revealed to be a clone, experiments upon Alice and Matt Addison in flashbacks, transforming Matt into the Nemesis. He later revives Alice after she dies in a helicopter crash following the destruction of Raccoon City and enhances her powers. When Alice escapes the facility, Isaacs lets her go and activates "Program: Alice". Five years later in Resident Evil: Extinction, Isaacs hunts for Alice in the post-apocalyptic wasteland of North America while performing experiments using Alice's blood and clones of her in an attempt to find a cure for the T-virus. Isaacs' experiments create the Super Undead which he unleashes upon Claire Redfield's convoy in the ruins of Las Vegas while trying to simultaneously capture Alice. After his efforts fail, Isaacs flees back to base, but not before getting bitten by a Super Undead. Despite taking massive quantities of the anti-virus, Isaacs mutates into a creature with near-invulnerability and telekinetic abilities that surpass Alice's own. Isaacs slaughters the Umbrella staff and battles Alice through the recreation of the Hive. In a final confrontation in the Laser Corridor, Isaacs is destroyed when an Alice clone takes control of the laser grid and uses it to slice him to pieces. This particular clone appeared to be more of an employee of the company, working as virologist and subservient to Albert Wesker, closer in nature to the clones of Alice's allies used as shock troopers in Resident Evil: Retribution than the clone that would later appear in The Final Chapter.

In The Final Chapter, after being captured by an Umbrella convoy leading an army of Undead to Raccoon City, Alice is shocked to find it commanded by Isaacs, having thought him dead years before. Isaacs uses human captives dragged behind the tank to lure the Undead to follow him. Alice quickly realizes that the Isaacs she previously fought was just a clone with Isaacs telling her that he was awoken from stasis to finish leading the destruction of humanity. Alice eventually manages to escape, chopping off Isaacs' hand in the process. Isaacs leads his army against the last human settlement in the ruins of Raccoon City, but Alice commands an effective defense, destroying the army and Isaacs commandos. Isaacs himself manages to escape, and takes command of another Umbrella army, slaughtering a tank crew and leading the army into the crater leading to the Hive in an effort to stop Alice once and for all.

In the Hive, Alice encounters another Isaacs, awoken by Wesker, who reveals himself to be the real Alexander Isaacs and the one Alice encountered in the convoy to be a clone who was unaware of his true nature. The real Isaacs has technological upgrades that give him an advantage against Alice, predicting her every move. Isaacs reveals Alice's own true nature as a clone of Alicia Marcus and his plan to kill both Alice and Alicia which will give him full control of Umbrella. Alicia uses her fifty percent control of Umbrella to fire Wesker, allowing the Red Queen, allied with Alice, to crush Wesker's legs with a door. Isaacs flees with the anti-virus that can stop the T-virus once and for all and shuts the Red Queen down so that she can't help Alice anymore. Isaacs proves to be more than a match for both Alice and Claire Redfield, slicing off three of Alice's fingers in the Laser Corridor, but being apparently defeated when she places an activated grenade in his pocket at the same time. Isaacs life support system revives him in time to stop Alice from releasing the anti-virus, but he is then confronted by his clone. In an ironic twist, Isaacs is stabbed to death by his own clone when the clone can't accept that he isn't the real Isaacs, a piece of programing in the clones that Isaacs had earlier found amusing. The Isaacs clone is killed by his own Undead army, allowing Alice to retrieve and release the anti-virus as the Hive is destroyed by explosives she planted. The destruction of the Hive and the Umbrella elite within cements the end of Umbrella and Isaacs plan while the Red Queen is able to reactivate herself once Isaacs is dead and call off the Umbrella attack on the remaining human settlements.

 James Shade/One James Shade (played by Colin Salmon) was a soldier in charge of collecting Alice from the Hive. He was killed by Umbrella's defense weapon laser when sliced him into pieces. He later reappeared in Resident Evil: Retribution as a clone trooper loyal to Umbrella. Near the end of the movie, he is shot dead by one of Alice's allies, Barry, who is then killed by Shade's own allies. In The Final Chapter, Alice destroys the Hive using explosives that she finds in the leftover equipment of Shade's team.

 Terri Morales  Terri Morales' (played by Sandrine Holt) is a main character and one of the protagonists in Resident Evil: Apocalypse. She was the weather reporter for the Raccoon City News Channel known as Raccoon 7. 

Prior to the events of the film Resident Evil: Apocalypse, she had been dismissed from the station for an unspecified event shortly before the zombie outbreak, and became stranded along with the rest of Raccoon City's population at the city gates when they were shut down, preventing their escape. She teamed up with Jill Valentine and Peyton Wells to find another escape route from the city, carrying a camcorder with her. She hoped to document their travels in video from a survivor's perspective, to win an Emmy Award and regain her lost credibility. She was ultimately killed when Jill and L.J. split up from her in the school to find the missing Angela Ashford, being ambushed by a horde of zombie children who devour her alive. 

Terri's legacy lived on in her camcorder, retrieved by Jill after her death, and given to Alice to continue to record the events of the outbreak to expose Umbrella. After they escape the city however, the tape is declared a hoax after Umbrella covers their tracks by blaming the city's destruction on a meltdown. The efforts to contain the outbreak failed though, as seen in Resident Evil: Extinction'', so although the tape was finally believed by the public, the truth ultimately meant nothing anymore as the world was plunged into a zombie apocalypse.

See also
List of Resident Evil game characters

References

Resident Evil
Film
Characters